"Incognito" is the second single from Celine Dion's album Incognito, released on 25 May 1987 in Quebec, Canada. It was written by Luc Plamondon, Dion's later collaborator. The single contained "Ma chambre", a non-album track as B-side. On 6 June 1987 the song entered the Quebec Singles Chart and became a hit reaching number 1 for six weeks. It spent thirty four weeks on the chart in total. "Incognito" won a Félix Award for Best Pop Song of the Year. It was also released as a single in France in September 1988. The song was later included on the 2005 greatest hits album On ne change pas. A live version is included in the Céline une seule fois / Live 2013 CD/DVD.

Music video
The music video was directed by Jacques Payette and released in 1987. It also opened the Incognito TV special aired in September 1987 and was produced by Canadian Broadcasting Corporation. It can be found on Dion's DVD On ne change pas.

Track listings and formats
Canadian 7" single
"Incognito" – 4:26
"Ma chambre" – 4:00

French 7" single
"Incognito" – 4:37
"D'abord, c'est quoi l'amour" – 4:22

Charts

See also
Félix Award

References

External links

1987 singles
1987 songs
Celine Dion songs
Columbia Records singles
French-language songs
Songs with lyrics by Luc Plamondon
Songs written by Jean Roussel
The Lost Fingers songs